The Hino XL series are identical series of Class 7 and 8 conventional cab trucks produced by Hino Motors primarily in the United States and Canada. Introduced in 2019, it was the first model launched by Hino Motors under the modernized nameplate, next to the Class 6/7 L series and the Class 4/5 M series. It is the first truck powered by Hino's newly developed 9-liter diesel engine.

Specifications
The Hino XL series comprises two models: the Hino XL7 is a Class 7 with a rigid tri-axle layout, and the Hino XL8 is a Class 8 but have a larger. A tractor version of the XL8 also added.

The exterior design of the XL series features an LED strip with projector headlamps, and a stylish bumper. The interior also features a 4-spoke steering wheel, a 7-inch Multi Information Display (MID) and a selection of options.

The XL series are powered by the newly developed 8.9-liter A09C six-cylinder diesel engine. Transmissions come from Allison in auto and Eaton in manual.

Production commenced in September 2019 at its new plant in Mineral Wells, West Virginia. It is marketed exclusively for the United States.

Also in 2019, it is assembled in Canada, at its current plant in Woodstock, Ontario.

Engines

Hino Motors vehicles
Vehicles introduced in 2019
Class 7 trucks
Class 8 trucks